Statistics of Dhivehi League for the 2014 season. 2014 Dhivehi League started on June 16.

Teams
BG Sports Club
Club All Youth Linkage
Club Eagles
Club Valencia
Mahibadhoo SC
Maziya S&RC
New Radiant SC
Victory SC

Personnel
Note: Flags indicate national team as has been defined under FIFA eligibility rules. Players may hold more than one non-FIFA nationality.

Managerial changes

* Anil continues as assistant coach.

League table
Format: In Round 1 and Round 2, all eight teams play against each other. Top six teams after Round 2 play against each other in Round 3. Teams with most total points after Round 3 are crowned the Dhivehi League champions and qualify for the AFC Cup. The top four teams qualify for the President's Cup. Bottom two teams after Round 2 play against top two teams of Second Division in Dhivehi League Qualification for places in next year's Dhivehi League.

Standings of round 1

Standings of round 2

Standings of round 3

Final standings

Positions by round
The table lists the positions of teams after each week of matches.

Matches

Round 1 matches
A total of 28 matches will be played in this round.

Round 2 matches
A total of 20 matches will be played in this round.

Round 3 matches
A total of 15 matches will be played in this round.

Season statistics

Hat-tricks

4 Player scored 4 goals
5 Player scored 5 goals

Promotion/relegation playoff for 2015 Dhivehi League

Matches
A total of 6 matches will be played in this round. Top 2 reams will be promoted to 2015 Dhivehi Premier League and the bottom 2 teams relegated to the 2015 Second Division Football Tournament.

References

Dhivehi League seasons
Maldives
Maldives
1